Friends with Money is a 2006 American comedy-drama film written and directed by Nicole Holofcener. It opened the 2006 Sundance Film Festival on January 19, 2006, and went into limited release in North America on April 7, 2006.

Plot
Olivia is a single, always broke woman who cleans houses in Los Angeles to make ends meet.  She is in a group of wealthy friends consisting of: Franny – a stay at home mom with a large trust fund, Christine – a television writer, Jane – a fashion designer, and their husbands.

While the disparity in financial situations between Olivia and her friends creates some friction, each woman is facing her own individual struggles. Olivia can't seem to find love or money.  Franny's inheritance sometimes causes tension between her and her accountant husband, who likes to spend it. Christine's marriage is falling apart. Jane is increasingly unpleasant because she's not growing old gracefully. Together, these women attend charity benefits, have lunch, lean on each other, and wade their way through life.

Cast

Jennifer Aniston as Olivia
Catherine Keener as Christine
Frances McDormand as Jane
Joan Cusack as Franny
Jason Isaacs as David
Scott Caan as Mike
Simon McBurney as Aaron
Greg Germann as Matt
Marin Hinkle as Maya
Timm Sharp as Richard
Jake Cherry as Wyatt
Ty Burrell as Other Aaron
Bob Stephenson as Marty

Box office
In its opening weekend in wide release, the film grossed a total of $4.96 million, ranking tenth at the North American box office, this soon became $13,367,101 domestically and $18,245,244 worldwide even though it received a limited release in most weeks (under 600 screens).

Critical reception
The film received generally positive reviews from critics. The review aggregator Rotten Tomatoes reported that 72% of the critics gave the film a positive review, based on 152 reviews, with an average rating of 6.6/10. The site's critical consensus reads, "Strong lead performances, witty dialogue and wry observations cement Friends With Money as another winning dramedy from writer/director Nicole Holofcener." Metacritic reported the film had an average score of 68 out of 100, based on 38 reviews.

Awards and nominations 
At the 2006 Independent Spirit Awards, Frances McDormand won the award for Best Supporting Female and Nicole Holofcener was nominated for Best Screenplay. Holofcener also won the Dorothy Arzner Directors Award from the Women in Film Crystal Awards, shared with Joey Lauren Adams for Come Early Morning and Lian Lunson for Leonard Cohen: I'm Your Man. Holofcener received a nomination from the Alliance of Women Film Journalists for Best Comedy by or About Women.

Home media
The film was released on DVD on August 29, 2006. It has grossed $29.60m in U.S. DVD/home video rentals.

Soundtrack

References

External links
 
 
 

2000s English-language films
2006 independent films
2000s female buddy films
2006 comedy-drama films
2006 films
American comedy-drama films
American female buddy films
Films about social class
Films directed by Nicole Holofcener
Films set in Los Angeles
Films with screenplays by Nicole Holofcener
Sony Pictures Classics films
2000s American films